4951 Iwamoto, provisional designation , is a stony, synchronous binary asteroid and slow rotator from the inner regions of the asteroid belt, approximately 5.5 kilometers in diameter. It was discovered on 21 January 1990, by Japanese astronomers Yoshikane Mizuno and Toshimasa Furuta at Kani Observatory in Japan.

Orbit 

Iwamoto orbits the Sun in the inner main-belt at a distance of 1.9–2.6 AU once every 3 years and 5 months (1,239 days). Its orbit has an eccentricity of 0.17 and an inclination of 8° with respect to the ecliptic.

Physical characteristics 

In the SMASS classification, Iwamoto is a common S-type asteroid.

Diameter and albedo 

According to the survey carried out by NASA's Wide-field Infrared Survey Explorer with its subsequent NEOWISE mission, Iwamoto measures 5.192 and 5.515 kilometers in diameter, and its surface has an albedo of 0.218 and 0.186, respectively. The Collaborative Asteroid Lightcurve Link adopts Petr Pravec's revised WISE-data, that is, an albedo of 0.1844 and a diameter of 5.528 kilometers with on an absolute magnitude of 13.74.

Slow rotator 

From 25 December 2006 to 23 March 2007, photometric observations of Iwamoto were obtained by the international community of photometrists at Badlands Observatory (SD, USA), Ondřejov Observatory (Czech Republic), Modra Observatory (Slovakia), Carbuncle Hill Observatory (RI, USA), Sonoita Research Observatory (AZ, USA), Kharkiv Observatory (Ukraine), McDonald Observatory (TX, USA), Ironwood Observatory (HI, USA), Leura Observatory (Australia), Skalnaté pleso Observatory (Slovakia), Shed of Science Observatory (MN, USA), Pic du Midi Observatory (France).

Lightcurve analysis gave a rotation period of 118 hours with a brightness variation of 0.34 magnitude. In May 2011, astronomers Etienne Morelle, Raoul Behrend obtained another lightcurve with a concurring period of 118 hours and an amplitude of 0.38 magnitude.(). With such a long period, Iwamoto is also a slow rotator, as the vast majority of asteroids have a much shorter rotation period of 2.2 to 20 hours.

Binary system 

During the photometric observations in 2006/7, it was revealed that Iwamoto ("primary") is a synchronous binary system with a minor-planet moon ("secondary") orbiting it every 4.917 days (or 118 hours, which identical to the primary's rotation). Based on the secondary-to-primary mean-diameter ratio (Ds/Dp) of at least 0.76, it was estimated that Iwamoto and its moon measure 4.0 and 3.5 kilometers, respectively. The diameter of Iwamoto has since increased to 5.5 kilometers (see above). The "Jonstonarchive" estimates that the moon has a semi-major axis of 31 kilometers.

Naming 

This minor planet was named in honor of Japanese astronomer Masayuki Iwamoto (born 1954), a discoverer of minor planets at the Tokushima Observatory. The approved naming citation was published by the Minor Planet Center on 5 March 1996.

Notes

References

External links 
 Asteroids with Satellites, Robert Johnston, johnstonsarchive.net
 Asteroid Lightcurve Database (LCDB), query form (info )
 Dictionary of Minor Planet Names, Google books
 Asteroids and comets rotation curves, CdR – Observatoire de Genève, Raoul Behrend
 Discovery Circumstances: Numbered Minor Planets (1)-(5000) – Minor Planet Center
 
 

004951
Discoveries by Yoshikane Mizuno
Discoveries by Toshimasa Furuta
Named minor planets
004951
004951
004951
19900121